Ronnie Ellis Williams (born January 6, 1996) is an American professional baseball pitcher who is currently a free agent. He was drafted by the St. Louis Cardinals in the second round of the 2014 Major League Baseball draft.

Career
Williams attended American Senior High School in Miami, Florida, where he played baseball and went 8-2 with a 0.97 ERA as a senior.

St. Louis Cardinals
After his senior year, he was selected by the St. Louis Cardinals in the second round with the 68th overall selection of the 2014 Major League Baseball draft. He spent six seasons in the Cardinals system, but missed nearly all of the 2018 season with an elbow injury. He reached as high as the Class AA Springfield Cardinals of the Texas League in 2019.

San Francisco Giants
Williams was selected by the San Francisco Giants in the 2020 Rule 5 Draft. He was assigned to the Richmond Flying Squirrels of the Double-A Northeast to begin the 2021 season and was promoted to the Sacramento River Cats of the Triple-A West in early September. Over 29 games (five starts) between the two clubs, Williams went 6-4 with a 2.77 ERA and 69 strikeouts over 78 innings. Williams elected minor league free agency after the season.

Kia Tigers
On December 26, 2021, Williams signed with the Kia Tigers of the KBO League on a $300,000 contract that included a $100,000 signing bonus. He was released on June 29, 2022.

San Francisco Giants (second stint)
On July 14, 2022, Williams signed a minor league deal with the San Francisco Giants. He elected free agency on November 10, 2022.

See also
Rule 5 draft results

References

External links

Minor league baseball players
1996 births
Living people